Attwell is a surname. Notable people with the name include:

Arthur Attwell (1920–1991), Anglican clergyman
Bob Attwell (born 1959), Canadian ice hockey player
David Attwell, British neuroscientist
Ernest T. Attwell (1877–1949), American football coach
J. Evans Attwell (1931–2007), American attorney
Jamie Attwell (born 1982), English football player
Mabel Lucie Attwell (1879–1964), British illustrator
Michael Attwell (1943–2006), English actor
Reg Attwell (1920–1986), English football player
Ron Attwell (born 1935), Canadian ice hockey player
Rory Attwell (born 1980), British musician
Stuart Attwell (born 1982), English football referee

See also
Atwell (surname)